Andrés Useche is a Colombian American writer, film director, graphic artist, singer-songwriter and activist. 

The recipient of many accolades  , Useche has worked as screenwriter, composer, editor, producer, script doctor and acting coach, and has directed Golden Globe, Emmy and Academy award-winners like Jennifer Aniston, Ben Stiller, Robin Williams, Paul Rudd, Naomi Watts, Woody Harrelson, James Gandolfini, John Leguizamo and Tamlyn Tomita, among many others. Useche's environmental, pro-democracy, humanitarian filmmaking efforts also include world leaders like Presidents Barack Obama  and Joe Biden  , and many national and international figures, Democratic senators and high-ranking officials.

Early life
Andres Useche was born in Manizales, Colombia where he wrote and drew his first published political cartoon, "Soy Libre", at age 11. In high school, he won the Colombian Ministry of Culture Individual Creation Prize in Graphic Arts with his graphic novel Vana Espuma ("Idle Mist"). Upon high school graduation Useche scored documentaries and composed "Azul de Noche", a quintet performed by members of the Manizales Chamber Orchestra.

Career
Useche wrote and drew comics as a child, turning 11 years old by the time his political cartoons were first published. While in high school he created award-winning comics which led to his multiple roles, writing, directing, editing, scoring and starring in a film adaptation of one of his graphic novels. The movie had a minuscule $100 budget  but won the Best Fiction Film, Best screenplay and Best actress César Awards, along with other nominations for Useche for Best Actor and Best Music. 

After graduating as a visual designer with emphasis on Film from the Universidad de Caldas, Useche moved to  Los Angeles, California to work as a filmmaker, eventually gaining dual citizenship.

Andres Useche's complemented activism with his filmmaking career, collaborating with  Hayden Panettiere,  Naomi Watts, Courteney Cox, Mariska Hargitay, Jason Mraz,  Evan Handler, Rob Morrow, Carrie Ann Inaba, Chris Tashima, and Richard Kind among others .

Simultaneously, Useche taught screenwriting, film directing and editing in the university and international festival contexts, and later became a university professor, teaching a Master's in professional screenwriting in Los Angeles.

In 2008, in support of Sen. Barack Obama's presidential campaign, Useche volunteered, sang and spoke at rallies and wrote, performed and co-directed in the viral video "Si Se Puede Cambiar", a Spanish language music video also directed by Eric Byler and Warren Fu, which debuted on YouTube on February 22, from the group United For Obama. On April 8, 2008, "Si Se Puede Cambiar" was chosen by YouTube to represent Obama in the first ever "Trendsetter Tuesday". The video was featured on the main page of the site along with videos about the other remaining US presidential candidates. "Si Se Puede Cambiar" quickly reached over 400,000 views and maintained a rating of 4/5 stars, beating the scores for the Hillary Clinton and John McCain videos. The video had been watched in 193 countries. Versions of the video with subtitles in German, French, Chinese, Vietnamese, Korean and Arabic have also been released. Subsequently, Andres directed another music video, this time singing in English, to support Barack Obama during the general elections. With United for Obama, he collaborated on several other voter-outreach videos aimed at different minorities.

Through 2008 Andrés gave television, radio and newspaper interviews in which he promoted Obama's campaign.

On December 29, a live TV news program reported Andrés Useche had been tapped to sing at the Presidential Inaugural Ball and Gala "We The People" at Capitol Hill, Washington, D.C., on January 20, 2009.

Andres was also confirmed to perform at The Latino Inaugural Gala to be held at the Hall of the Americas / The Organization of American States (OAS) across the street from White House grounds on January 19, 2009.

On September 9, 2009, a 96.3 FM Colombian radio special featuring an Andres Useche career retrospective, mentioned Useche's stated intention to direct another film in Colombia.

In 2010 Andrés Useche directed "The Cove: My Friend is..." (inspired by The Cove (film)) in which he joined forces with Oscar-winning producer Fisher Stevens, and many talented artists.
 Andres also worked as composer, co-writer and co-editor on the project.

Useche's further environmental efforts led him to direct to Oceans: Sylvia Earle's Journey.

In response to the passing of Arizona SB 1070, Andres Useche wrote and recorded the song "Marching into the Light". On May 19, 2010 he traveled to Phoenix, performing the song and joining marches protesting the law. Images from the rallies and subsequent travels around the country appear in the music video for Marching into the Light, also directed by Andres and dedicated to the memory of Tam Tran and Cinthya Felix, two recently deceased DREAM Act activists from UCLA. Andres also took to the airways speaking on various TV news programs to denounce what he felt was racial profiling implicit in the law and called for compassion, unity and comprehensive immigration reform in the United States. The Obama administration also opposed Arizona SB 1070 and the bill was blocked at the federal level. Republican Arizona State Sen. Russell Pearce, who had been the architect of the controversial senate bill, was voted out of office in a special recall election.

In 2010, Andres continued live performances of "Marching into the Light" supporting immigration reform and the stand against SB1070.

Andres continued pushing for immigration reform in the United States and wrote the song "Dream to Belong" in direct support of the DREAM Act. He first performed the song at the Dream Alliance State Wide Summit in Austin, TX on Saturday, January 28, 2012. A week later, a short clip of the song was broadcast for the first time during a lengthy interview Andres Useche gave to a radio station out of Denver, CO. Useche defended the DREAMers throughout the interview and contrasted Barack Obama's support for the legislation with the Republican position against it.

Throughout 2012 Andres also aided DREAM Act organizations, sang in support of immigrants in the U.S. and backed efforts which culminated in the Obama administration's "Deferred Action for Childhood Arrivals" (DACA) initiative which grants deportation relief and work permits to the undocumented youth.

The music video for Dream to Belong shows Andres Useche, activists, DREAMers and politicians campaigning for the DREAM Act and Comprehensive Immigration Reform around the country.

The video also includes cameos by immigration Reform allies such as President Barack Obama, Senator Dick Durbin, congressman Luis Gutiérrez, Secretary of State Hillary Clinton, political satirist Stephen Colbert, golden globe award-winning actress Claire Danes, actress and activist Rosario Dawson, civil rights icon Dolores Huerta, singer Shakira, talk-show host Cristina Saralegui, Representative Raul Grijalva and many more.

The video also documents Benita Veliz' participation at the Democratic convention, the first time in history that an undocumented person was invited to address a national political convention.

DREAMers and activists singing along with Useche can also be seen protesting the 2012 candidacy of Republican Mitt Romney, who had vowed to veto the DREAM Act if elected president. The signs they are seen holding in the video read "Veto Romney, not the DREAM Act".

The video was released ahead of the first 2013 legislative session to support the push for Immigration Reform. Andres Useche was one of the "voices ranging from members of Congress to nationally recognized advocates" that participated in "Embracing Our American Values" a pro-Immigration Reform carnival celebrated on the anniversary of the adoption by the United Nations of the Universal Declaration of Human Rights.

Andres Useche spoke at the White House in support of Immigrant Rights, DACA and immigration reform.

During Earth Day 2015, Useche wrote an environmental song called Lo Que Vamos a Dejar / What We Leave Behind, and directed the music video which was later released in support of #ActOnClimate and President Barack Obama's #CleanPowerPlan, an effort to protect the environment.

Useche opposed Donald Trump's candidacy, and supported Democrat Hillary Clinton, singing concerts in partisan and non-partisan events . During the Trump presidency, Useche sang in many peaceful protests in support immigrant and human rights including at the Capitol of the United States. 

In 2016,  Still Here, a film written, directed, edited and scored by Andres Useche won an award for excellence at an International Human Rights film festival. The award was given "for outstanding efforts in digital storytelling and for courageously fighting to increase equality, freedom of speech, eradicate discrimination, and to protect human rights to all people".

In 2016, his ongoing performances and speaking engagements at national and international events included the United Nations/World Bank's "All 4 The Green"  which included the German Federal Ministry of Economic Cooperation and the Italian Ministry of Environment, and was broadcast worldwide by Connect4Climate from Bologna, Italy. 

In the US, Useche protested the Trump administration's separation of immigrant families, and sang massive "Families Belong Together" concerts in 2018.  Useche, joining then Senator Kamala Harris and various human rights organizations, took part in a protest in front of the Otay detention center where immigrant children were being held, separated from their parents.

Andres Useche also took part of the March for Our Lives rallies  and performed and spoke in support of environmental protection and climate change awareness, at universities like UC Berkeley  and other national events like the annual Green Latinos Summit. 

As a California OFA Lead, he organized get-out-the-vote efforts during the 2018 congressional elections in which Democrats retook the majority in the House of Representatives. Useche endorsements included Mike Levin, also backed by former President Barack Obama.

A fraction of Andres Useche's participation in protests and rallies in support of immigrant rights throughout the United States was documented by PBS: Frontline in an episode which aired in 2019.

Useche's international event appearances that year include his return to San Diego Comic-con as panelist and performer. In this career retrospective, he spoke about harnessing the power of art and media to empower the voices calling for social and environmental justice.

In response to the Trump administration's "Muslim ban" and the detention and deportation of asylum seekers, Useche wrote and recorded the song The Flame You Keep. He would later use this song in an award-winning film he wrote, directed and edited in support of refugees.

Useche also expressed his support for Black Lives Matter and participated in several peaceful demonstrations.

Andres Useche endorsed the 2020 Democratic ticket of Joe Biden and Kamala Harris and collaborated with Todos con Biden and AAPIs for Biden, creating music, video and media to support the Biden Harris campaign. Useche's work included various music videos for his own original Biden-Harris song: "All On The Line". Partially filmed after  COVID-19 hit the US, the videos written, directed, produced and co-edited by Andres Useche also honor medical first responders and celebrate the peaceful Black Lives Matter movement as well as the contributions of essential workers including the immigrant community.  "All On The Line" features Joe Biden, Kamala Harris, Jill Biden, Dolores Huerta, Barack Obama, Michelle Obama, Stacey Abrams, Douglas Emhoff, Gabby Giffords, Charlotte Clymer, Tom Perez, Mike Levin, Eva Longoria among others. The "Unity" version of the video premiered during the virtual portion of the United States Presidential Inauguration on January 20, 2021 

On a CNN News18 interview about his latest music video, Andres Useche spoke about his collaborative process and the dire need to reject Trumpism and white supremacy, lauding the incoming Biden Harris administration for their inclusive policy proposals and diverse cabinet picks.

References

External links
 director Andrés Useche, Hollywood and "The Cove" Join Forces for Dolphin Awareness, Andres Useche interview for Mashable
 Marching into the Light music video by Andrés Useche on Daily Kos
 Trailer for "Aun Aqui" a film by Andres Useche on the Internet Movie Database
 Andrés Useche TV interview on Univision news program.
 Andrés Useche, el Otro Colombiano que Cantara para Obama on El Colombiano
 Andrés Useche sings for Change (the Obama Kind)  on the Austin Chronicle
 Si Se Puede Cambiar Useche for Obama video on YouTube
 
 Borges: Influence and References - Andrés Useche by Manu El on www.themodernworld.com
 "Election rocks to a new Latin beat "Andrés Useche",   and other artists express their support on The Miami Herald 
 Protagonistas del Mundo: Andrés Useche  on RCN Radio/TV station
 Channel 9 News: Andrés Useche and other young Democrats on Vice-Presidential debate on CBS Television

1977 births
Colombian singer-songwriters
Colombian male writers
Living people
Colombian film directors
21st-century Colombian male singers
American singer-songwriters
American rock songwriters
American film directors
Anti-racism activists
Activists for Hispanic and Latino American civil rights
Nonviolence advocates
American male singer-songwriters
American rock singers
Colombian emigrants to the United States
American music video directors
21st-century American male singers
21st-century American singers